The Ku Klux Klan, commonly shortened to the KKK or the Klan, is an American white supremacist, right-wing terrorist, and hate group whose primary targets are African Americans, Jews, Latinos, Asian Americans, Native Americans, and Catholics, as well as immigrants, leftists, homosexuals, Muslims, atheists, and abortion providers.

The Klan has existed in three distinct eras. Each has advocated extremist reactionary positions such as white nationalism, anti-immigration and—especially in later iterations—Nordicism, antisemitism, anti-Catholicism, Prohibition, right-wing populism, anti-communism, homophobia, anti-atheism, Islamophobia, and anti-progressivism. The first Klan founded by Confederate veterans used terrorism—both physical assault and murder—against politically active Black people and their allies in the Southern United States in the late 1860s. The second iteration of the Klan originated in the 1910s, and was the first to use cross burnings and hooded robes. During the First Red Scare, the Klan integrated anti-communism into its doctrine.  The third Klan used murders and bombings from the late 1940s to the early 1960s to achieve its aims. All three movements have called for the "purification" of American society, and are all considered far-right extremist organizations. In each era, membership was secret and estimates of the total were highly exaggerated by both friends and enemies.

The first Klan was established in the wake of the American Civil War and was a defining organization of the Reconstruction era. Organized in numerous chapters across the Southern United States, federal law enforcement suppressed it around 1871. It sought to overthrow the Republican state governments in the South, especially by using voter intimidation and targeted violence against African-American leaders. Each chapter was autonomous and highly secretive about membership and plans. Members made their own, often colorful, costumes: robes, masks and conical hats, designed to be terrifying and to hide their identities.

The second Klan started in 1915 as a small group in Georgia. It grew after 1920 and flourished nationwide in the early and mid-1920s, including urban areas of the Midwest and West. Taking inspiration from D. W. Griffith's 1915 silent film The Birth of a Nation, which mythologized the founding of the first Klan, it employed marketing techniques and a popular fraternal organization structure. Rooted in local Protestant communities, it sought to maintain white supremacy, often took a pro-Prohibition and pro-compulsory public education stance, and it opposed Jews, while also stressing its opposition to the alleged political power of the pope and the Catholic Church. This second Klan flourished both in the south and northern states; it was funded by initiation fees and selling its members a standard white costume. The chapters did not have dues. It used K-words which were similar to those used by the first Klan, while adding cross burnings and mass parades to intimidate others. It rapidly declined in the latter half of the 1920s.

The third and current manifestation of the KKK emerged after 1950, in the form of localized and isolated groups that use the KKK name. They have focused on opposition to the civil rights movement, often using violence and murder to suppress activists. This manifestation is classified as a hate group by the Anti-Defamation League and the Southern Poverty Law Center. , the Anti-Defamation League puts total KKK membership nationwide at around 3,000, while the Southern Poverty Law Center puts it at 6,000 members total.

The second and third incarnations of the Ku Klux Klan made frequent references to a false mythologized perception of America's "Anglo-Saxon" blood, hearkening back to 19th-century nativism. Although members of the KKK swear to uphold Christian morality, Christian denominations widely denounce them.

Overview

First Klan

The first Klan was founded in Pulaski, Tennessee, on December 24, 1865, by six former officers of the Confederate army: Frank McCord, Richard Reed, John Lester, John Kennedy, J. Calvin Jones, and James Crowe. It started as a fraternal social club inspired at least in part by the then largely defunct Sons of Malta. It borrowed parts of the initiation ceremony from that group, with the same purpose: "ludicrous initiations, the baffling of public curiosity, and the amusement for members were the only objects of the Klan", according to Albert Stevens in 1907. The manual of rituals was printed by Laps D. McCord of Pulaski. The origins of the hood are uncertain; it may have been appropriated from the Spanish capirote hood, or it may be traced to the uniform of Southern Mardi Gras celebrations.

According to The Cyclopædia of Fraternities (1907), "Beginning in April, 1867, there was a gradual transformation. ... The members had conjured up a veritable Frankenstein. They had played with an engine of power and mystery, though organized on entirely innocent lines, and found themselves overcome by a belief that something must lie behind it all—that there was, after all, a serious purpose, a work for the Klan to do."

Although there was little organizational structure above the local level, similar groups rose across the South and adopted the same name and methods. Klan groups spread throughout the South as an insurgent movement promoting resistance and white supremacy during the Reconstruction Era. For example, Confederate veteran John W. Morton founded a chapter in Nashville, Tennessee. As a secret vigilante group, the Klan targeted freedmen and their allies; it sought to restore white supremacy by threats and violence, including murder. "They targeted white Northern leaders, Southern sympathizers and politically active Blacks." In 1870 and 1871, the federal government passed the Enforcement Acts, which were intended to prosecute and suppress Klan crimes.

The first Klan had mixed results in terms of achieving its objectives. It seriously weakened the Black political leadership through its use of assassinations and threats of violence, and it drove some people out of politics. On the other hand, it caused a sharp backlash, with passage of federal laws that historian Eric Foner says were a success in terms of "restoring order, reinvigorating the morale of Southern Republicans, and enabling Blacks to exercise their rights as citizens". Historian George C. Rable argues that the Klan was a political failure and therefore was discarded by the Democratic Party leaders of the South. He says:

After the Klan was suppressed, similar insurgent paramilitary groups arose that were explicitly directed at suppressing Republican voting and turning Republicans out of office: the White League, which started in Louisiana in 1874; and the Red Shirts, which started in Mississippi and developed chapters in the Carolinas. For instance, the Red Shirts are credited with helping elect Wade Hampton as governor in South Carolina. They were described as acting as the military arm of the Democratic Party and are attributed with helping white Democrats regain control of state legislatures throughout the South.

Second Klan

In 1915, the second Klan was founded atop Stone Mountain, Georgia, by William Joseph Simmons. While Simmons relied on documents from the original Klan and memories of some surviving elders, the revived Klan was based significantly on the wildly popular film The Birth of a Nation. The earlier Klan had not worn the white costumes and had not burned crosses; these aspects were introduced in Thomas Dixon's book The Clansman: A Historical Romance of the Ku Klux Klan, on which the film was based. When the film was shown in Atlanta in December of that year, Simmons and his new klansmen paraded to the theater in robes and pointed hoods – many on robed horses – just like in the film. These mass parades became another hallmark of the new Klan that had not existed in the original Reconstruction-era organization.

Beginning in 1921, it adopted a modern business system of using full-time, paid recruiters and it appealed to new members as a fraternal organization, of which many examples were flourishing at the time. The national headquarters made its profit through a monopoly on costume sales, while the organizers were paid through initiation fees. It grew rapidly nationwide at a time of prosperity. Reflecting the social tensions pitting urban versus rural America, it spread to every state and was prominent in many cities. 

Writer W. J. Cash, in his 1941 book The Mind of the South characterized the second Klan as "anti-Negro, anti-Alien, anti-Red, anti-Catholic, anti-Jew, anti-Darwin, anti-Modern, anti-Liberal, Fundamentalist, vastly Moral, [and] militantly Protestant. And summing up these fears, it brought them into focus with the tradition of the past, and above all with the ancient Southern pattern of high romantic histrionics, violence and mass coercion of the scapegoat and the heretic." It preached "One Hundred Percent Americanism" and demanded the purification of politics, calling for strict morality and better enforcement of Prohibition. Its official rhetoric focused on the threat of the Catholic Church, using anti-Catholicism and nativism. Its appeal was directed exclusively toward white Protestants; it opposed Jews, Black people, Catholics, and newly arriving Southern and Eastern European immigrants such as Italians, Russians, and Lithuanians, many of whom were Jewish or Catholic. 

Some local groups threatened violence against rum runners and those they deemed "notorious sinners"; the violent episodes generally took place in the South. The Red Knights were a militant group organized in opposition to the Klan and responded violently to Klan provocations on several occasions.

The second Klan was a formal fraternal organization, with a national and state structure. During the resurgence of the second Klan in the 1920s, its publicity was handled by the Southern Publicity Association. Within the first six months of the Association's national recruitment campaign, Klan membership had increased by 85,000. At its peak in the mid-1920s, the organization's membership ranged from three to eight million members.

In 1923, Simmons was ousted as leader of the KKK by Hiram Wesley Evans. From September 1923 there were two Ku Klux Klan organizations: the one founded by Simmons and led by Evans with its strength primarily in the southern United States, and a breakaway group led by Grand Dragon D. C. Stephenson based in Evansville, Indiana with its membership primarily in the midwestern United States.

Internal divisions, criminal behavior by leaders – especially Stephenson's conviction for the abduction, rape, and murder of Madge Oberholtzer – and external opposition brought about a collapse in the membership of both groups. The main group's membership had dropped to about 30,000 by 1930. It finally faded away in the 1940s. Klan organizers also operated in Canada, especially in Saskatchewan in 1926–1928, where Klansmen denounced immigrants from Eastern Europe as a threat to Canada's "Anglo-Saxon" heritage.

Third Klan
The "Ku Klux Klan" name was used by numerous independent local groups opposing the civil rights movement and desegregation, especially in the 1950s and 1960s. During this period, they often forged alliances with Southern police departments, as in Birmingham, Alabama; or with governor's offices, as with George Wallace of Alabama. Several members of Klan groups were convicted of murder in the deaths of civil rights workers in Mississippi in 1964 and of children in the bombing of the 16th Street Baptist Church in Birmingham in 1963.

The United States government still considers the Klan to be a "subversive terrorist organization". In April 1997, FBI agents arrested four members of the True Knights of the Ku Klux Klan in Dallas for conspiracy to commit robbery and for conspiring to blow up a natural gas processing plant. In 1999, the city council of Charleston, South Carolina, passed a resolution declaring the Klan a terrorist organization. 

The existence of modern Klan groups has been in a state of consistent decline due to a variety of factors from the American public's negative distaste of the group's image, platform, and history, infiltration and prosecution by law enforcement, civil lawsuit forfeitures, and the radical right-wing's perception of the Klan as outdated and unfashionable. The Southern Poverty Law Center reported that just between 2016 and 2019 the number of Klan groups in America dropped from 130 to just 51. A 2016 report by the Anti-Defamation League claims an estimate of just over 30 active Klan groups existing in the United States. Estimates of total collective membership range from about 3,000 to 8,000. In addition to its active membership, the Klan has an "unknown number of associates and supporters".

History

Origin of the name
The name was probably formed by combining the Greek  (κύκλος, which means circle) with clan. The word had previously been used for other fraternal organizations in the South such as Kuklos Adelphon.

First Klan: 1865–1871

Creation and naming

Six Confederate veterans from Pulaski, Tennessee, created the original Ku Klux Klan on December 24, 1865, shortly after the Civil War, during the Reconstruction of the South. The group was known for a short time as the "Kuklux Clan". The Ku Klux Klan was one of a number of secret, oath-bound organizations using violence, which included the Southern Cross in New Orleans (1865) and the Knights of the White Camelia (1867) in Louisiana.

Historians generally classify the KKK as part of the post-Civil War insurgent violence related not only to the high number of veterans in the population, but also to their effort to control the dramatically changed social situation by using extrajudicial means to restore white supremacy. In 1866, Mississippi governor William L. Sharkey reported that disorder, lack of control, and lawlessness were widespread; in some states armed bands of Confederate soldiers roamed at will. The Klan used public violence against Black people and their allies as intimidation. They burned houses and attacked and killed Black people, leaving their bodies on the roads. While racism was a core belief of the Klan, anti-Semitism was not. Many prominent southern Jews identified wholly with southern culture, resulting in examples of Jewish participation in the Klan.

At an 1867 meeting in Nashville, Tennessee, Klan members gathered to try to create a hierarchical organization with local chapters eventually reporting to a national headquarters. Since most of the Klan's members were veterans, they were used to such military hierarchy, but the Klan never operated under this centralized structure. Local chapters and bands were highly independent.

Former Confederate brigadier general George Gordon developed the Prescript, which espoused white supremacist belief. For instance, an applicant should be asked if he was in favor of "a white man's government", "the reenfranchisement and emancipation of the white men of the South, and the restitution of the Southern people to all their rights". The latter is a reference to the Ironclad Oath, which stripped the vote from white persons who refused to swear that they had not borne arms against the Union.

Confederate general Nathan Bedford Forrest was elected the first grand wizard, and claimed to be the Klan's national leader. In an 1868 newspaper interview, Forrest stated that the Klan's primary opposition was to the Loyal Leagues, Republican state governments, people such as Tennessee governor William Gannaway Brownlow, and other "carpetbaggers" and "scalawags". He argued that many Southerners believed that Black people were voting for the Republican Party because they were being hoodwinked by the Loyal Leagues. One Alabama newspaper editor declared "The League is nothing more than a nigger Ku Klux Klan."

Despite Gordon's and Forrest's work, local Klan units never accepted the Prescript and continued to operate autonomously. There were never hierarchical levels or state headquarters. Klan members used violence to settle old personal feuds and local grudges, as they worked to restore general white dominance in the disrupted postwar society. The historian Elaine Frantz Parsons describes the membership:

Lifting the Klan mask revealed a chaotic multitude of anti-Black vigilante groups, disgruntled poor white farmers, wartime guerrilla bands, displaced Democratic politicians, illegal whiskey distillers, coercive moral reformers, sadists, rapists, white workmen fearful of Black competition, employers trying to enforce labor discipline, common thieves, neighbors with decades-old grudges, and even a few freedmen and white Republicans who allied with Democratic whites or had criminal agendas of their own. Indeed, all they had in common, besides being overwhelmingly white, southern, and Democratic, was that they called themselves, or were called, Klansmen.

Historian Eric Foner observed: "In effect, the Klan was a military force serving the interests of the Democratic party, the planter class, and all those who desired restoration of white supremacy. Its purposes were political, but political in the broadest sense, for it sought to affect power relations, both public and private, throughout Southern society. It aimed to reverse the interlocking changes sweeping over the South during Reconstruction: to destroy the Republican party's infrastructure, undermine the Reconstruction state, reestablish control of the Black labor force, and restore racial subordination in every aspect of Southern life. To that end they worked to curb the education, economic advancement, voting rights, and right to keep and bear arms of Black people. The Klan soon spread into nearly every Southern state, launching a reign of terror against Republican leaders both Black and white. Those political leaders assassinated during the campaign included Arkansas Congressman James M. Hinds, three members of the South Carolina legislature, and several men who served in constitutional conventions."

Activities

Klan members adopted masks and robes that hid their identities and added to the drama of their night rides, their chosen time for attacks. Many of them operated in small towns and rural areas where people otherwise knew each other's faces, and sometimes still recognized the attackers by voice and mannerisms. "The kind of thing that men are afraid or ashamed to do openly, and by day, they accomplish secretly, masked, and at night." The KKK night riders "sometimes claimed to be ghosts of Confederate soldiers so, as they claimed, to frighten superstitious Blacks. Few freedmen took such nonsense seriously."

The Klan attacked Black members of the Loyal Leagues and intimidated Southern Republicans and Freedmen's Bureau workers. When they killed Black political leaders, they also took heads of families, along with the leaders of churches and community groups, because these people had many roles in society. Agents of the Freedmen's Bureau reported weekly assaults and murders of Black people.

"Armed guerrilla warfare killed thousands of Negroes; political riots were staged; their causes or occasions were always obscure, their results always certain: ten to one hundred times as many Negroes were killed as whites." Masked men shot into houses and burned them, sometimes with the occupants still inside. They drove successful Black farmers off their land. "Generally, it can be reported that in North and South Carolina, in 18 months ending in June 1867, there were 197 murders and 548 cases of aggravated assault."

Klan violence worked to suppress Black voting, and campaign seasons were deadly. More than 2,000 people were killed, wounded, or otherwise injured in Louisiana within a few weeks prior to the Presidential election of November 1868. Although St. Landry Parish had a registered Republican majority of 1,071, after the murders, no Republicans voted in the fall elections. White Democrats cast the full vote of the parish for President Grant's opponent. The KKK killed and wounded more than 200 Black Republicans, hunting and chasing them through the woods. Thirteen captives were taken from jail and shot; a half-buried pile of 25 bodies was found in the woods. The KKK made people vote Democratic and gave them certificates of the fact.

In the April 1868 Georgia gubernatorial election, Columbia County cast 1,222 votes for Republican Rufus Bullock. By the November presidential election, Klan intimidation led to suppression of the Republican vote and only one person voted for Ulysses S. Grant.

Klansmen killed more than 150 African Americans in a county in Florida, and hundreds more in other counties. Florida Freedmen's Bureau records provided a detailed recounting of Klansmen's beatings and murders of freedmen and their white allies.

Milder encounters, including some against white teachers, also occurred. In Mississippi, according to the Congressional inquiry:

One of these teachers (Miss Allen of Illinois), whose school was at Cotton Gin Port in Monroe County, was visited ... between one and two o'clock in the morning in March 1871, by about fifty men mounted and disguised. Each man wore a long white robe and his face was covered by a loose mask with scarlet stripes. She was ordered to get up and dress which she did at once and then admitted to her room the captain and lieutenant who in addition to the usual disguise had long horns on their heads and a sort of device in front. The lieutenant had a pistol in his hand and he and the captain sat down while eight or ten men stood inside the door and the porch was full. They treated her "gentlemanly and quietly" but complained of the heavy school-tax, said she must stop teaching and go away and warned her that they never gave a second notice. She heeded the warning and left the county.

By 1868, two years after the Klan's creation, its activity was beginning to decrease. Members were hiding behind Klan masks and robes as a way to avoid prosecution for freelance violence. Many influential Southern Democrats feared that Klan lawlessness provided an excuse for the federal government to retain its power over the South, and they began to turn against it. There were outlandish claims made, such as Georgian B. H. Hill stating "that some of these outrages were actually perpetrated by the political friends of the parties slain."

Resistance

Union Army veterans in mountainous Blount County, Alabama, organized "the anti-Ku Klux". They put an end to violence by threatening Klansmen with reprisals unless they stopped whipping Unionists and burning Black churches and schools. Armed Black people formed their own defense in Bennettsville, South Carolina, and patrolled the streets to protect their homes.

National sentiment gathered to crack down on the Klan, even though some Democrats at the national level questioned whether the Klan really existed, or believed that it was a creation of nervous Southern Republican governors. Many southern states began to pass anti-Klan legislation.

In January 1871, Pennsylvania Republican senator John Scott convened a congressional committee which took testimony from 52 witnesses about Klan atrocities, accumulating 12 volumes. In February, former Union general and congressman Benjamin Franklin Butler of Massachusetts introduced the Civil Rights Act of 1871 (Ku Klux Klan Act). This added to the enmity that Southern white Democrats bore toward him. While the bill was being considered, further violence in the South swung support for its passage. The governor of South Carolina appealed for federal troops to assist his efforts in keeping control of the state. A riot and massacre occurred in a Meridian, Mississippi, courthouse, from which a Black state representative escaped by fleeing to the woods. The 1871 Civil Rights Act allowed the president to suspend habeas corpus.

In 1871, President Ulysses S. Grant signed Butler's legislation. The Ku Klux Klan Act and the Enforcement Act of 1870 were used by the federal government to enforce the civil rights provisions for individuals under the constitution. The Klan refused to voluntarily dissolve after the 1871 Klan Act, so President Grant issued a suspension of habeas corpus and stationed federal troops in nine South Carolina counties by invoking the Insurrection Act of 1807. The Klansmen were apprehended and prosecuted in federal court. Judges Hugh Lennox Bond and George S. Bryan presided over the trial of KKK members in Columbia, South Carolina, during December 1871. The defendants were given from three months to five years of incarceration with fines. More Black people served on juries in federal court than on local or state juries, so they had a chance to participate in the process. Hundreds of Klan members were fined or imprisoned during the crackdown.

End of the first Klan
Klan leader Nathan Bedford Forrest boasted that the Klan was a nationwide organization of 550,000 men and that he could muster 40,000 Klansmen within five days' notice. However, the Klan had no membership rosters, no chapters, and no local officers, so it was difficult for observers to judge its membership. It had created a sensation by the dramatic nature of its masked forays and because of its many murders.

In 1870, a federal grand jury determined that the Klan was a "terrorist organization" and issued hundreds of indictments for crimes of violence and terrorism. Klan members were prosecuted, and many fled from areas that were under federal government jurisdiction, particularly in South Carolina. Many people not formally inducted into the Klan had used the Klan's costume to hide their identities when carrying out independent acts of violence. Forrest called for the Klan to disband in 1869, arguing that it was "being perverted from its original honorable and patriotic purposes, becoming injurious instead of subservient to the public peace". Historian Stanley Horn argues that "generally speaking, the Klan's end was more in the form of spotty, slow, and gradual disintegration than a formal and decisive disbandment". A Georgia-based reporter wrote in 1870: "A true statement of the case is not that the Ku Klux are an organized band of licensed criminals, but that men who commit crimes call themselves Ku Klux".

In many states, officials were reluctant to use Black militia against the Klan out of fear that racial tensions would be raised. Republican governor of North Carolina William Woods Holden called out the militia against the Klan in 1870, adding to his unpopularity. This and extensive violence and fraud at the polls caused the Republicans to lose their majority in the state legislature. Disaffection with Holden's actions contributed to white Democratic legislators impeaching him and removing him from office, but their reasons for doing so were numerous.

Klan operations ended in South Carolina and gradually withered away throughout the rest of the South. Attorney General Amos Tappan Ackerman led the prosecutions.

Foner argues that:

New groups of insurgents emerged in the mid-1870s, local paramilitary organizations such as the White League, Red Shirts, saber clubs, and rifle clubs, that intimidated and murdered Black political leaders. The White League and Red Shirts were distinguished by their willingness to cultivate publicity, working directly to overturn Republican officeholders and regain control of politics.

In 1882, the Supreme Court ruled in United States v. Harris that the Klan Act was partially unconstitutional. It ruled that Congress's power under the Fourteenth Amendment did not include the right to regulate against private conspiracies. It recommended that persons who had been victimized should seek relief in state courts, which were entirely unsympathetic to such appeals.

Klan costumes, also called "regalia", disappeared from use by the early 1870s, after Grand Wizard Forrest called for their destruction as part of disbanding the Klan. The Klan was broken as an organization by 1872. In 1915, William Joseph Simmons held a meeting to revive the Klan in Georgia; he attracted two aging former members, and all other members were new.

Second Klan: 1915–1944

Refounding in 1915
In 1915 the film The Birth of a Nation was released, mythologizing and glorifying the first Klan and its endeavors. The second Ku Klux Klan was founded in 1915 by William Joseph Simmons at Stone Mountain, near Atlanta, with fifteen "charter members". Its growth was based on a new anti-immigrant, anti-Catholic, Prohibitionist and anti-Semitic agenda, which reflected contemporary social tensions, particularly recent immigration. The new organization and chapters adopted regalia featured in The Birth of a Nation; membership was kept secret by wearing masks in public.

The Birth of a Nation

Director D. W. Griffith's The Birth of a Nation glorified the original Klan. The film was based on the book and play The Clansman: A Historical Romance of the Ku Klux Klan, as well as the book The Leopard's Spots, both by Thomas Dixon Jr. Much of the modern Klan's iconography is derived from it, including the standardized white costume and the burning cross. Its imagery was based on Dixon's romanticized concept of old England and Scotland, as portrayed in the novels and poetry of Sir Walter Scott. The film's influence was enhanced by a false claim of endorsement by President Woodrow Wilson. Dixon was an old friend of Wilson's and, before its release, there was a private showing of the film at the White House. A publicist claimed that Wilson said, "It is like writing history with lightning, and my only regret is that it is all so terribly true." Wilson strongly disliked the film and felt he had been tricked by Dixon. The White House issued a denial of the "lightning" quote, saying that he was entirely unaware of the nature of the film and at no time had expressed his approbation of it.

Goals

The first and third Klans were primarily Southeastern groups aimed against Black people. The second Klan, in contrast, broadened the scope of the organization to appeal to people in the Midwestern and Western states who considered Catholics, Jews, and foreign-born minorities to be anti-American.

The Second Klan saw threats from every direction. According to historian Brian R. Farmer, "two-thirds of the national Klan lecturers were Protestant ministers". Much of the Klan's energy went into guarding the home, and historian Kathleen Blee says that its members wanted to protect "the interests of white womanhood". Joseph Simmons published the pamphlet ABC of the Invisible Empire in Atlanta in 1917; in it, he identified the Klan's goals as "to shield the sanctity of the home and the chastity of womanhood; to maintain white supremacy; to teach and faithfully inculcate a high spiritual philosophy through an exalted ritualism; and by a practical devotedness to conserve, protect and maintain the distinctive institutions, rights, privileges, principles and ideals of a pure Americanism". Such moral-sounding purpose underlay its appeal as a fraternal organization, recruiting members with a promise of aid for settling into the new urban societies of rapidly growing cities such as Dallas and Detroit. During the 1930s, particularly after James A. Colescott of Indiana took over as imperial wizard, opposition to Communism became another primary aim of the Klan.

Organization
New Klan founder William J. Simmons joined 12 different fraternal organizations and recruited for the Klan with his chest covered with fraternal badges, consciously modeling the Klan after fraternal organizations. Klan organizers called "Kleagles" signed up hundreds of new members, who paid initiation fees and received KKK costumes in return. The organizer kept half the money and sent the rest to state or national officials. When the organizer was done with an area, he organized a rally, often with burning crosses, and perhaps presented a Bible to a local Protestant preacher. He left town with the money collected. The local units operated like many fraternal organizations and occasionally brought in speakers.

Simmons initially met with little success in either recruiting members or in raising money, and the Klan remained a small operation in the Atlanta area until 1920. The group produced publications for national circulation from its headquarters in Atlanta: Searchlight (1919–1924), Imperial Night-Hawk (1923–1924), and The Kourier.

Perceived moral threats
The second Klan grew primarily in response to issues of declining morality typified by divorce, adultery, defiance of Prohibition, and criminal gangs in the news every day. It was also a response to the growing power of Catholics and American Jews and the accompanying proliferation of non-Protestant cultural values. The Klan had a nationwide reach by the mid-1920s, with its densest per capita membership in Indiana. It became most prominent in cities with high growth rates between 1910 and 1930, as rural Protestants flocked to jobs in Detroit and Dayton in the Midwest, and Atlanta, Dallas, Memphis, and Houston in the South. Close to half of Michigan's 80,000 Klansmen lived in Detroit.

Members of the KKK swore to uphold American values and Christian morality, and some Protestant ministers became involved at the local level. However, no Protestant denomination officially endorsed the KKK; indeed, the Klan was repeatedly denounced by the major Protestant magazines, as well as by all major secular newspapers. Historian Robert Moats Miller reports that "not a single endorsement of the Klan was found by the present writer in the Methodist press, while many of the attacks on the Klan were quite savage. ...The Southern Baptist press condoned the aims but condemned the methods of the Klan." National denominational organizations never endorsed the Klan, but they rarely condemned it by name. Many nationally and regionally prominent churchmen did condemn it by name, and none endorsed it.

The second Klan was less violent than either the first or third Klan were. However, the second Klan, especially in the Southeast, was not an entirely non-violent organization. The most violent Klan was in Dallas, Texas. In April 1921, shortly after they began gaining popularity in the area, the Klan kidnapped Alex Johnson, a Black man who had been accused of having sex with a white woman. They burned the letters "KKK" into his forehead and gave him a severe beating by a riverbed. The police chief and district attorney refused to prosecute, explicitly and publicly stating they believed that Johnson deserved this treatment. Encouraged by the approval of this whipping, the Dallas KKK whipped 68 people by the riverbed in 1922 alone. Although Johnson had been Black, most of the Dallas KKK's whipping victims were white men who were accused of offenses against their wives such as adultery, wife beating, abandoning their wives, refusing to pay child support or gambling. Far from trying to hide its vigilante activity, the Dallas KKK loved to publicize it. The Dallas KKK often invited local newspaper reporters to attend their whippings so they could write a story about it in the next day's newspaper.

The Alabama KKK was less chivalrous than the Dallas KKK was and whipped both white and Black women who were accused of fornication or adultery. Although many people in Alabama were outraged by the whippings of white women, no Klansmen were ever convicted for the violence.

Rapid growth
In 1920, Simmons handed the day-to-day activities of the national office over to two professional publicists, Elizabeth Tyler and Edward Young Clarke. The new leadership invigorated the Klan and it grew rapidly. It appealed to new members based on current social tensions, and stressed responses to fears raised by defiance of Prohibition and new sexual freedoms. It emphasized anti-Jewish, anti-Catholic, anti-immigrant and later anti-Communist positions. It presented itself as a fraternal, nativist and strenuously patriotic organization; and its leaders emphasized support for vigorous enforcement of Prohibition laws. It expanded membership dramatically to a 1924 peak of 1.5 million to 4 million, which was between 4–15% of the eligible population.

By the 1920s, most of its members lived in the Midwest and West. Nearly one in five of the eligible Indiana population were members. It had a national base by 1925. In the South, where the great majority of whites were Democrats, the Klansmen were Democrats. In the rest of the country, the membership comprised both Republicans and Democrats, as well as independents. Klan leaders tried to infiltrate political parties; as Cummings notes, "it was non-partisan in the sense that it pressed its nativist issues to both parties". Sociologist Rory McVeigh has explained the Klan's strategy in appealing to members of both parties:

Religion was a major selling point. Kelly J. Baker argues that Klansmen seriously embraced Protestantism as an essential component of their white supremacist, anti-Catholic, and paternalistic formulation of American democracy and national culture. Their cross was a religious symbol, and their ritual honored Bibles and local ministers. But no nationally prominent religious leader said he was a Klan member.

Economists Fryer and Levitt argue that the rapid growth of the Klan in the 1920s was partly the result of an innovative, multi-level marketing campaign. They also argue that the Klan leadership focused more intently on monetizing the organization during this period than fulfilling the political goals of the organization. Local leaders profited from expanding their membership.

Prohibition
Historians agree that the Klan's resurgence in the 1920s was aided by the national debate over Prohibition. The historian Prendergast says that the KKK's "support for Prohibition represented the single most important bond between Klansmen throughout the nation". The Klan opposed bootleggers, sometimes with violence. In 1922, two hundred Klan members set fire to saloons in Union County, Arkansas. Membership in the Klan and in other Prohibition groups overlapped, and they sometimes coordinated activities.

Urbanization

A significant characteristic of the second Klan was that it was an organization based in urban areas, reflecting the major shifts of population to cities in the North, West, and the South. In Michigan, for instance, 40,000 members lived in Detroit, where they made up more than half of the state's membership. Most Klansmen were lower- to middle-class whites who feared the waves of newcomers to the industrial cities: immigrants from Southern and Eastern Europe, who were mostly Catholic or Jewish; and Black and white migrants from the South. As new populations poured into cities, rapidly changing neighborhoods created social tensions. Because of the rapid pace of population growth in industrializing cities such as Detroit and Chicago, the Klan grew rapidly in the Midwest. The Klan also grew in booming Southern cities such as Dallas and Houston.

In the medium-size industrial city of Worcester, Massachusetts, in the 1920s, the Klan ascended to power quickly but declined as a result of opposition from the Catholic Church. There was no violence and the local newspaper ridiculed Klansmen as "night-shirt knights". Half of the members were Swedish Americans, including some first-generation immigrants. The ethnic and religious conflicts among more recent immigrants contributed to the rise of the Klan in the city. Swedish Protestants were struggling against Irish Catholics, who had been entrenched longer, for political and ideological control of the city.

In some states, historians have obtained membership rosters of some local units and matched the names against city directory and local records to create statistical profiles of the membership. Big city newspapers were often hostile and ridiculed Klansmen as ignorant farmers. Detailed analysis from Indiana showed that the rural stereotype was false for that state:

Indiana's Klansmen represented a wide cross section of society: they were not disproportionately urban or rural, nor were they significantly more or less likely than other members of society to be from the working class, middle class, or professional ranks. Klansmen were Protestants, of course, but they cannot be described exclusively or even predominantly as fundamentalists. In reality, their religious affiliations mirrored the whole of white Protestant society, including those who did not belong to any church.

The Klan attracted people but most of them did not remain in the organization for long. Membership in the Klan turned over rapidly as people found out that it was not the group which they had wanted. Millions joined and at its peak in the 1920s the organization claimed numbers that amounted to 15% of the nation's eligible population. The lessening of social tensions contributed to the Klan's decline.

Costumes and the burning cross

The distinctive white costume permitted large-scale public activities, especially parades and cross-burning ceremonies, while keeping the membership rolls a secret. Sales of the costumes provided the main financing for the national organization, while initiation fees funded local and state organizers.

The second Klan embraced the burning Latin cross as a dramatic display of symbolism, with a tone of intimidation. No crosses had been used as a symbol by the first Klan, but it became a symbol of the Klan's quasi-Christian message. Its lighting during meetings was often accompanied by prayer, the singing of hymns, and other overtly religious symbolism. In his novel The Clansman, Thomas Dixon Jr. borrows the idea that the first Klan had used fiery crosses from 'the call to arms' of the Scottish Clans, and film director D.W. Griffith used this image in The Birth of a Nation; Simmons adopted the symbol wholesale from the movie, and the symbol and action have been associated with the Klan ever since.

Women
By the 1920s, the KKK developed a women's auxiliary, with chapters in many areas. Its activities included participation in parades, cross lightings, lectures, rallies, and boycotts of local businesses owned by Catholics and Jews. The Women's Klan was active in promoting Prohibition, stressing liquor's negative impact on wives and children. Its efforts in public schools included distributing Bibles and petitioning for the dismissal of Catholic teachers. As a result of the Women's Klan's efforts, Texas would not hire Catholic teachers to work in its public schools. As sexual and financial scandals rocked the Klan leadership late in the 1920s, the organization's popularity among both men and women dropped off sharply.

Political role

The second Klan expanded with new chapters in cities in the Midwest and West, and reached both Republicans and Democrats, as well as men without a party affiliation. The goal of Prohibition in particular helped the Klan and some Republicans to make common cause in the North.

The Klan had numerous members in every part of the United States, but was particularly strong in the South and Midwest. At its peak, claimed Klan membership exceeded four million and comprised 20% of the adult white male population in many broad geographic regions, and 40% in some areas. The Klan also moved north into Canada, especially Saskatchewan, where it opposed Catholics.

In Indiana, members were American-born, white Protestants and covered a wide range of incomes and social levels. The Indiana Klan was perhaps the most prominent Ku Klux Klan in the nation. It claimed more than 30% of white male Hoosiers as members. In 1924 it supported Republican Edward Jackson in his successful campaign for governor.

Catholic and liberal Democrats—who were strongest in northeastern cities—decided to make the Klan an issue at the 1924 Democratic National Convention in New York City. Their delegates proposed a resolution indirectly attacking the Klan; it was defeated by one vote out of 1,100. The leading presidential candidates were William Gibbs McAdoo, a Protestant with a base in the South and West where the Klan was strong, and New York governor Al Smith, a Catholic with a base in the large cities. After weeks of stalemate and bitter argumentation, both candidates withdrew in favor of a compromise candidate.

In some states, such as Alabama and California, KKK chapters had worked for political reform. In 1924, Klan members were elected to the city council in Anaheim, California. The city had been controlled by an entrenched commercial-civic elite that was mostly German American. Given their tradition of moderate social drinking, the German Americans did not strongly support Prohibition laws – the mayor had been a saloon keeper. Led by the minister of the First Christian Church, the Klan represented a rising group of politically oriented non-ethnic Germans who denounced the elite as corrupt, undemocratic and self-serving. The historian Christopher Cocoltchos says the Klansmen tried to create a model, orderly community. The Klan had about 1,200 members in Orange County, California. The economic and occupational profile of the pro- and anti-Klan groups shows the two were similar and about equally prosperous. Klan members were Protestants, as were most of their opponents, but the latter also included many Catholic Germans. Individuals who joined the Klan had earlier demonstrated a much higher rate of voting and civic activism than did their opponents. Cocoltchos suggests that many of the individuals in Orange County joined the Klan out of that sense of civic activism. The Klan representatives easily won the local election in Anaheim in April 1924. They fired city employees who were known to be Catholic, and replaced them with Klan appointees. The new city council tried to enforce Prohibition. After its victory, the Klan chapter held large rallies and initiation ceremonies over the summer. The opposition organized, bribed a Klansman for the secret membership list, and exposed the Klansmen running in the state primaries; they defeated most of the candidates. Klan opponents in 1925 took back local government, and succeeded in a special election in recalling the Klansmen who had been elected in April 1924. The Klan in Anaheim quickly collapsed, its newspaper closed after losing a libel suit, and the minister who led the local Klavern moved to Kansas.

In the South, Klan members were still Democratic, as it was essentially a one-party region for whites. Klan chapters were closely allied with Democratic police, sheriffs, and other functionaries of local government. Due to disenfranchisement of most African Americans and many poor whites around the start of the 20th century, the only political activity for whites took place within the Democratic Party.

In Alabama, Klan members advocated better public schools, effective Prohibition enforcement, expanded road construction, and other political measures to benefit lower-class white people. By 1925, the Klan was a political force in the state, as leaders such as J. Thomas Heflin, David Bibb Graves, and Hugo Black tried to build political power against the Black Belt wealthy planters, who had long dominated the state. In 1926, with Klan support, Bibb Graves won the Alabama governor's office. He was a former Klan chapter head. He pushed for increased education funding, better public health, new highway construction, and pro-labor legislation. Because the Alabama state legislature refused to redistrict until 1972, and then under court order, the Klan was unable to break the planters' and rural areas' hold on legislative power.

Scholars and biographers have recently examined Hugo Black's Klan role. Ball finds regarding the KKK that Black "sympathized with the group's economic, nativist, and anti-Catholic beliefs". Newman says Black "disliked the Catholic Church as an institution" and gave over 100 anti-Catholic speeches to KKK meetings across Alabama in his 1926 election campaign. Black was elected US senator in 1926 as a Democrat. In 1937 President Franklin D. Roosevelt appointed Black to the Supreme Court without knowing how active in the Klan he had been in the 1920s. He was confirmed by his fellow Senators before the full KKK connection was known; Justice Black said he left the Klan when he became a senator.

Resistance and decline

Many groups and leaders, including prominent Protestant ministers such as Reinhold Niebuhr in Detroit, spoke out against the Klan, gaining national attention. The Jewish Anti-Defamation League was formed in the early 20th century in response to attacks on Jewish Americans, including the lynching of Leo Frank in Atlanta, and to the Klan's campaign to prohibit private schools (which was chiefly aimed at Catholic parochial schools). Opposing groups worked to penetrate the Klan's secrecy. After one civic group in Indiana began to publish Klan membership lists, there was a rapid decline in the number of Klan members. The National Association for the Advancement of Colored People (NAACP) launched public education campaigns in order to inform people about Klan activities and lobbied in Congress against Klan abuses. After its peak in 1925, Klan membership in most areas began to decline rapidly.
Specific events contributed to the Klan's decline as well. In Indiana, the scandal surrounding the 1925 murder trial of Grand Dragon D. C. Stephenson destroyed the image of the KKK as upholders of law and order. By 1926 the Klan was "crippled and discredited". D. C. Stephenson was the grand dragon of Indiana and 22 northern states. In 1923 he had led the states under his control in order to break away from the national KKK organization. At his 1925 trial, he was convicted of second-degree murder for his part in the rape, and subsequent death, of Madge Oberholtzer. After Stephenson's conviction, the Klan declined dramatically in Indiana.

The historian Leonard Moore says that a failure in leadership caused the Klan's collapse:

Stephenson and the other salesmen and office seekers who maneuvered for control of Indiana's Invisible Empire lacked both the ability and the desire to use the political system to carry out the Klan's stated goals. They were uninterested in, or perhaps even unaware of, grass roots concerns within the movement. For them, the Klan had been nothing more than a means for gaining wealth and power. These marginal men had risen to the top of the hooded order because, until it became a political force, the Klan had never required strong, dedicated leadership. More established and experienced politicians who endorsed the Klan, or who pursued some of the interests of their Klan constituents, also accomplished little. Factionalism created one barrier, but many politicians had supported the Klan simply out of expedience. When charges of crime and corruption began to taint the movement, those concerned about their political futures had even less reason to work on the Klan's behalf.

In Alabama, KKK vigilantes launched a wave of physical terror in 1927. They targeted both Black and white people for violations of racial norms and for perceived moral lapses. This led to a strong backlash, beginning in the media. Grover C. Hall Sr., editor of the Montgomery Advertiser from 1926, wrote a series of editorials and articles that attacked the Klan. (Today the paper says it "waged war on the resurgent [KKK]".) Hall won a Pulitzer Prize for the crusade, the 1928 Editorial Writing Pulitzer, citing "his editorials against gangsterism, floggings and racial and religious intolerance". Other newspapers kept up a steady, loud attack on the Klan, referring to the organization as violent and "un-American". Sheriffs cracked down on activities. In the 1928 presidential election, the state voters overcame their initial opposition to the Catholic candidate Al Smith, and voted the Democratic Party line as usual.

Although in decline, a measure of the Klan's influence was still evident when it staged its march along Pennsylvania Avenue in Washington, D.C., in 1928. By 1930, Klan membership in Alabama dropped to less than 6,000. Small independent units continued to be active in the industrial city of Birmingham.

KKK units were active through the 1930s in parts of Georgia, with a group of "night riders" in Atlanta enforcing their moral views by flogging people who violated them, whites as well as Black people. In March 1940, they were implicated in the beating murders of a young white couple taken from their car on a lovers lane, and flogged a white barber to death for drinking, both in East Point, a suburb of Atlanta. More than 20 others were "brutally flogged". As the police began to investigate, they found the records of the KKK had disappeared from their East Point office. The cases were reported by the Chicago Tribune and the NAACP in its Crisis magazine, as well as local papers.

In 1940, three lynchings of Black men by whites (no KKK affiliation is known) took place in the South: Elbert Williams was the first NAACP member known to be killed for civil rights activities: he was murdered in Brownsville, Tennessee, for working to register Black people to vote, and several other activists were run out of town; Jesse Thornton was lynched in Luverne, Alabama, for a minor social infraction; and 16-year-old Austin Callaway, a suspect in the assault of a white woman, was taken from jail in the middle of the night and killed by six white men in LaGrange, Georgia. In January 2017, the police chief and mayor of LaGrange apologized for their offices' failures to protect Callaway, at a reconciliation service marking his death.

Labor and anti-unionism
In major Southern cities such as Birmingham, Alabama, Klan members kept control of access to the better-paying industrial jobs and opposed unions. During the 1930s and 1940s, Klan leaders urged members to disrupt the Congress of Industrial Organizations (CIO), which advocated industrial unions and accepted African-American members, unlike earlier unions. With access to dynamite and using the skills from their jobs in mining and steel, in the late 1940s some Klan members in Birmingham used bombings to destroy houses in order to intimidate upwardly mobile Black who moved into middle-class neighborhoods. "By mid-1949, there were so many charred house carcasses that the area [College Hills] was informally named Dynamite Hill."

Activism by these independent KKK groups in Birmingham increased as a reaction to the civil rights movement of the 1950s and 1960s. Independent Klan groups violently opposed the civil rights movement. KKK members were implicated in the 16th Street Baptist Church bombing on a Sunday in September 1963, which killed four African-American girls and injured 22 other people. Members of the Communist Workers' Party came to North Carolina to organize textile workers and pushed back against racial discrimination there, taunting the KKK, resulting in the 1979 Greensboro massacre.

Development of Christian Identity Theology

According to Professor Jon Schamber, Rev. Philip E. J. Monson branched off from the teachings of British Israelism and began to develop Christian Identity Theology in the 1910s. During the 1920s, Monson published Satan's Seat: The Enemy of Our Race in which he adopted Russel Kelso Carter's theory that Jews and non-whites were descended from the serpent in the Garden of Eden. Monson connected the work of the corrupt race to the activities of the Catholic Church and the Pope. Monson's ideas were popular among some KKK members in the 1950s.

National changes

In 1939, after experiencing several years of decline due to the Great Depression, the Imperial Wizard Hiram Wesley Evans sold the national organization to James A. Colescott, an Indiana veterinary physician, and Samuel Green, an Atlanta obstetrician. They could not revive the Klan's declining membership. In 1944, the Internal Revenue Service filed a lien for $685,000 in back taxes against the Klan, and Colescott dissolved the organization that year. Local Klan groups closed down over the following years.

After World War II, the folklorist and author Stetson Kennedy infiltrated the Klan; he provided internal data to media and law enforcement agencies. He also provided secret code words to the writers of the Superman radio program, resulting in episodes in which Superman took on the KKK. Kennedy stripped away the Klan's mystique and trivialized its rituals and code words, which may have contributed to the decline in Klan recruiting and membership. In the 1950s Kennedy wrote a bestselling book about his experiences, which further damaged the Klan.

Historiography of the second Klan
The historiography of the second Klan of the 1920s has changed over time. Early histories were based on mainstream sources of the time, but since the late 20th century, other histories have been written drawing from records and analysis of members of the chapters in social histories.

Anti-modern interpretations

The KKK was a secret organization; apart from a few top leaders, most members never identified as such and wore masks in public. Investigators in the 1920s used KKK publicity, court cases, exposés by disgruntled Klansmen, newspaper reports, and speculation to write stories about what the Klan was doing. Almost all the major national newspapers and magazines were hostile to its activities. The historian Thomas R. Pegram says that published accounts exaggerated the official viewpoint of the Klan leadership, and repeated the interpretations of hostile newspapers and the Klan's enemies. There was almost no evidence in that time regarding the behavior or beliefs of individual Klansmen. According to Pegram, the resulting popular and scholarly interpretation of the Klan from the 1920s into the mid-20th century emphasized its Southern roots and the violent vigilante-style actions of the Klan in its efforts to turn back the clock of modernity. Scholars compared it to fascism in Europe. Amann states that, "Undeniably, the Klan had some traits in common with European fascism—chauvinism, racism, a mystique of violence, an affirmation of a certain kind of archaic traditionalism—yet their differences were fundamental. ...[The KKK] never envisioned a change of political or economic system."

Pegram says this original interpretation

New social history interpretations
The "social history" revolution in historiography from the 1960s explored history from the bottom up. In terms of the Klan, it developed evidence based on the characteristics, beliefs, and behavior of the typical membership, and downplayed accounts by elite sources. Historians discovered membership lists and the minutes of local meetings from KKK chapters scattered around the country. They discovered that the original interpretation was largely mistaken about the membership and activities of the Klan; the membership was not anti-modern, rural or rustic and consisted of fairly well educated middle-class joiners and community activists. Half the members lived in the fast-growing industrial cities of the period: Chicago, Detroit, Philadelphia, Indianapolis, Denver, and Portland, Oregon, were Klan strongholds during the 1920s.

Studies find that in general, the KKK membership in these cities was from the stable, successful middle classes, with few members drawn from the elite or the working classes. Pegram, reviewing the studies, concludes, "the popular Klan of the 1920s, while diverse, was more of a civic exponent of white Protestant social values than a repressive hate group."

Kelly J. Baker argues that religion was critical—the KKK based its hatred on a particular brand of Protestantism that resonated with mainstream Americans: "Members embraced Protestant Christianity and a crusade to save America from domestic as well as foreign threats." Member were primarily Baptists, Methodists, and members of the Disciples of Christ, while men of "more elite or liberal" Protestant denominations such as Unitarians, Episcopalians, Congregationalists and Lutherans, were less likely to join.

Indiana and Alabama
In Indiana, traditional political historians focused on notorious leaders, especially D. C. Stephenson, the Grand Dragon of the Indiana Klan, whose conviction for the 1925 kidnap, rape, and murder of Madge Oberholtzer helped destroy the Ku Klux Klan movement nationwide. In his history of 1967, Kenneth Jackson already described the Klan of the 1920s as associated with cities and urbanization, with chapters often acting as a kind of fraternal organization to aid people coming from other areas.

Social historian Leonard Moore titled his monograph Citizen Klansmen (1997) and contrasted the intolerant rhetoric of the group's leaders with the actions of most of the membership. The Klan was white Protestant, established Americans who were fearful of change represented by new immigrants and Black migrants to the North. They were highly suspicious of Catholics, Jews and Black people, who they believed subverted ideal, Protestant moral standards. Violence was uncommon in most chapters. In Indiana, KKK members directed more threats and economic blacklisting primarily against fellow white Protestants for transgressions of community moral standards, such as adultery, wife-beating, gambling and heavy drinking. Up to one third of Indiana's Protestant men joined the order making it, Moore argued, "a kind of interest group for average white Protestants who believed that their values should be dominant in their community and state."

Moore says that they joined

Northern Indiana's industrial cities had attracted a large Catholic population of European immigrants and their descendants. They established the University of Notre Dame, a major Catholic college near South Bend. In May 1924, when the KKK scheduled a regional meeting in the city, Notre Dame students blocked the Klansmen and stole some KKK regalia. On the next day, the Klansmen counterattacked. Finally, the college president and the football coach Knute Rockne kept the students on campus to avert further violence.

In Alabama, some young, white, urban activists joined the KKK to fight the old guard establishment. Hugo Black was a member before becoming nationally famous; he focused on anti-Catholicism. However, in rural Alabama the Klan continued to operate to enforce Jim Crow laws; its members resorted more often to violence against Black people for infringements of the social order of white supremacy.

Racial terrorism was used in smaller towns to suppress Black political activity. Elbert Williams of Brownsville, Tennessee, was lynched in 1940 for trying to organize Black residents to register and vote; also that year, Jesse Thornton of Luverne, Alabama, was lynched for failing to address a police officer as "Mister".

Later Klans: 1950s–present
In 1944, the second KKK was disbanded by Imperial Wizard James A. Colescott after the IRS levied a large tax liability against the organization. In 1946, Samuel Green reestablished the KKK at a ceremony on Stone Mountain. His group primarily operated in Georgia. Green was succeeded by Samuel Roper as Imperial Wizard in 1949, and Roper was succeeded by Eldon Edwards in 1950. Based in Atlanta, Edwards worked to rebuild the organization by uniting the different factions of the KKK from other parts of the United States, but the strength of the organization was short-lived and the group fractured as it competed with other klan organizations. In 1959, Roy Davis was elected to follow Edwards as national leader. Edwards had previously appointed Davis Grand Dragon of Texas in an effort to unite their two klan organizations. Davis was already leading the Original Knights of the Ku Klux Klan in Texas, Arkansas, Louisiana, and Mississippi. Davis held rallies Florida and other southern states during 1961 and 1962 recruiting members. Davis had been a close associate of William J. Simmons and been active in the KKK since it first reformed in 1915.

Congress launched an investigation into the KKK in the early 1964, following the assassination of John F. Kennedy in Dallas. Davis, based in Dallas, resigned as Imperial Wizard of the Original Knights shortly after the Original Knights received a Congressional subpoena. The Original Knights became increasingly fractured in the immediate aftermath as many members were forced to testify before Congress. The White Knights of the Ku Klux Klan formed in 1964 after splitting from the Original Knights. According to an FBI report published in May 1965, the KKK was divided into 14 different organizations at the time with a total membership of approximately 9,000. The FBI reported that Roy Davis's Original Knights was the largest faction and had about 1,500 members. Robert Shelton of Alabama was leading a faction of 400–600 members. Congressional investigators found that by the end of 1965 most members of Original Knights organization joined Shelton's United Klans and the Original Knights of the KKK disbanded. Shelton's United Klan continued to absorb members from the competing factions and remained the largest Klan group unto the 1970s, peaking with an estimated 30,000 members and another 250,000 non-member supporters during the late 1960s.

1950s–1960s: post-war opposition to civil rights
After the decline of the national organization, small independent groups adopted the name "Ku Klux Klan", along with variations. They had no formal relationships with each other, and most had no connection to the second KKK, except for the fact that they copied its terminology and costumes. Beginning in the 1950s, for instance, individual Klan groups in Birmingham, Alabama, began to resist social change and Black people's efforts to improve their lives by bombing houses in transitional neighborhoods. The white men worked in mining and steel industries, with access to these materials. There were so many bombings of Black people's homes in Birmingham by Klan groups in the 1950s that the city was nicknamed "Bombingham".

During the tenure of Bull Connor as police commissioner in Birmingham, Klan groups were closely allied with the police and operated with impunity. When the Freedom Riders arrived in Birmingham in 1961, Connor gave Klan members fifteen minutes to attack the riders before sending in the police to quell the attack. When local and state authorities failed to protect the Freedom Riders and activists, the federal government began to establish intervention and protection. In states such as Alabama and Mississippi, Klan members forged alliances with governors' administrations. In Birmingham and elsewhere, the KKK groups bombed the houses of civil rights activists. In some cases they used physical violence, intimidation, and assassination directly against individuals. Continuing disfranchisement of Black people across the South meant that most could not serve on juries, which were all-white and demonstrably biased verdicts and sentences.

According to a report from the Southern Regional Council in Atlanta, the homes of 40 Black Southern families were bombed during 1951 and 1952. Some of the bombing victims were social activists whose work exposed them to danger, but most were either people who refused to bow to racist convention or were innocent bystanders, unsuspecting victims of random violence.

Among the more notorious murders by Klan members in the 1950s and 1960s:
 The 1951 Christmas Eve bombing of the home of National Association for the Advancement of Colored People (NAACP) activists Harry and Harriette Moore in Mims, Florida, resulting in their deaths.
 The 1957 murder of Willie Edwards Jr., who was forced by Klansmen to jump to his death from a bridge into the Alabama River.
 The 1963 assassination of NAACP organizer Medgar Evers in Mississippi. In 1994, former Ku Klux Klansman Byron De La Beckwith was convicted.
 The 16th Street Baptist Church bombing in September 1963 in Birmingham, Alabama, which killed four African-American girls and injured 22 people. The perpetrators were Klan members Robert Chambliss, convicted in 1977, Thomas Edwin Blanton Jr. and Bobby Frank Cherry, convicted in 2001 and 2002. The fourth suspect, Herman Cash, died before he was indicted.
 The 1964 murders of Chaney, Goodman, and Schwerner, three civil rights workers, in Mississippi. In June 2005, Klan member Edgar Ray Killen was convicted of manslaughter.
 The 1964 murder of two Black teenagers, Henry Hezekiah Dee and Charles Eddie Moore in Mississippi. In August 2007, based on the confession of Klansman Charles Marcus Edwards, James Ford Seale, a reputed Ku Klux Klansman, was convicted. Seale was sentenced to serve three life sentences. Seale was a former Mississippi policeman and sheriff's deputy.
 The 1965 Alabama murder of Viola Liuzzo. She was a Southern-raised Detroit mother of five who was visiting the state in order to attend a civil rights march. At the time of her murder, Liuzzo was transporting Civil Rights marchers related to the Selma to Montgomery March.
 The 1966 firebombing death of NAACP leader Vernon Dahmer Sr., 58, in Mississippi. In 1998 former Ku Klux Klan wizard Samuel Bowers was convicted of his murder and sentenced to life. Two other Klan members were indicted with Bowers, but one died before trial and the other's indictment was dismissed.
 In July 1966, in Bogalusa, Louisiana, a stronghold of Klan activity, Clarence Triggs was found murdered.
 The 1967 multiple bombings in Jackson, Mississippi, of the residence of a Methodist activist, Robert Kochtitzky, the synagogue, and the residence of Rabbi Perry Nussbaum. These were carried out by Klan member Thomas Albert Tarrants III, who was convicted in 1968. Another Klan bombing was averted in Meridian the same year.

Resistance
There was considerable resistance among African Americans and white allies to the Klan. In 1953, newspaper publishers W. Horace Carter (Tabor City, North Carolina), who had campaigned for three years, and Willard Cole (Whiteville, North Carolina) shared the Pulitzer Prize for Public Service citing "their successful campaign against the Ku Klux Klan, waged on their own doorstep at the risk of economic loss and personal danger, culminating in the conviction of over one hundred Klansmen and an end to terrorism in their communities". In a 1958 incident in North Carolina, the Klan burned crosses at the homes of two Lumbee Native Americans for associating with white people, and threatened more actions. When the KKK held a nighttime rally nearby, they were quickly surrounded by hundreds of armed Lumbee. Gunfire was exchanged, and the Klan was routed at what became known as the Battle of Hayes Pond.

While the Federal Bureau of Investigation (FBI) had paid informants in the Klan, for instance in Birmingham in the early 1960s, its relations with local law enforcement agencies and the Klan were often ambiguous. The head of the FBI, J. Edgar Hoover, appeared more concerned about Communist links to civil rights activists than about controlling Klan excesses against citizens. In 1964, the FBI's COINTELPRO program began attempts to infiltrate and disrupt civil rights groups.

As 20th-century Supreme Court rulings extended federal enforcement of citizens' civil rights, the government revived the Enforcement Acts and the Klan Act from Reconstruction days. Federal prosecutors used these laws as the basis for investigations and indictments in the 1964 murders of Chaney, Goodman, and Schwerner; and the 1965 murder of Viola Liuzzo. They were also the basis for prosecution in 1991 in Bray v. Alexandria Women's Health Clinic.

In 1965, the House Un-American Activities Committee started an investigation on the Klan, putting in the public spotlight its front organizations, finances, methods and divisions.

1970s–present

After federal legislation was passed prohibiting legal segregation and authorizing enforcement of protection of voting rights, KKK groups began to oppose court-ordered busing to desegregate schools, affirmative action, and the more open immigration authorized in the 1960s. In 1971, KKK members used bombs to destroy 10 school buses in Pontiac, Michigan. By 1975, there were known KKK groups on most college campuses in Louisiana as well as at Vanderbilt University, the University of Georgia, the University of Mississippi, the University of Akron, and the University of Southern California.

Massacre of Communist Workers' Party protesters
On November 3, 1979, five communist protesters were killed by KKK and American Nazi Party members in Greensboro, North Carolina, in what is known as the Greensboro massacre. The Communist Workers' Party had sponsored a rally against the Klan in an effort to organize predominantly Black industrial workers in the area. Klan members drove up with arms in their car trunks, and attacked marchers.

Jerry Thompson infiltration
Jerry Thompson, a newspaper reporter who infiltrated the KKK in 1979, reported that the FBI's COINTELPRO efforts were highly successful. Rival KKK factions accused each other's leaders of being FBI informants. William Wilkinson of the Invisible Empire, Knights of the Ku Klux Klan, was revealed to have been working for the FBI.

Thompson also related that KKK leaders showed great concern about a series of civil lawsuits filed by the Southern Poverty Law Center, claiming damages amounting to millions of dollars. These were filed after KKK members shot into a group of African Americans. Klansmen curtailed their activities in order to conserve money for defense against the lawsuits. The KKK also used lawsuits as tools; they filed a libel suit in order to prevent the publication of a paperback edition of Thompson's book, but were unsuccessful.

Chattanooga, Tennessee, shooting
In 1980, three KKK members shot four elderly Black women (Viola Ellison, Lela Evans, Opal Jackson, and Katherine Johnson) in Chattanooga, Tennessee, following a KKK initiation rally. A fifth woman, Fannie Crumsey, was injured by flying glass in the incident. Attempted murder charges were filed against the three KKK members, two of whom—Bill Church and Larry Payne—were acquitted by an all-white jury. The third defendant, Marshall Thrash, was sentenced by the same jury to nine months on lesser charges. He was released after three months. In 1982, a jury awarded the five women $535,000 in a civil trial.

Michael Donald lynching
After Michael Donald was lynched in 1981 in Alabama, the FBI investigated his death. The US attorney prosecuted the case. Two local KKK members were convicted for his murder, including Henry Francis Hays who was sentenced to death. After exhausting the appeals process, Hays was executed by electric chair for Donald's death in Alabama on June 6, 1997. It was the first time since 1913 that a white man had been executed in Alabama for a crime against an African American.

With the support of attorneys Morris Dees of the Southern Poverty Law Center (SPLC) and state senator Michael A. Figures, Donald's mother Beulah Mae Donald sued the KKK in civil court in Alabama. Her lawsuit against the United Klans of America was tried in February 1987. The all-white jury found the Klan responsible for the lynching of Donald and ordered the Klan to pay US $7 million, but the KKK did not have sufficient funds to pay the fine. They had to sell off their national headquarters building in Tuscaloosa.

Neo-Nazi alliances and Stormfront

In 1995, Don Black and Chloê Hardin, the ex-wife of the KKK grand wizard David Duke, began a small bulletin board system (BBS) called Stormfront, which has become a prominent online forum for white nationalism, Neo-Nazism, hate speech, racism, and antisemitism in the early 21st century.

Duke has an account on Stormfront which he uses to post articles from his own website. He also polls forum members for opinions and questions, in particular during his internet broadcasts. Duke has worked with Don Black on numerous projects including Operation Red Dog in 1980.

Current developments
The modern KKK is not one organization; rather it is composed of small independent chapters across the United States. According to a 1999 ADL report, the KKK's estimated size then was "No more than a few thousand, organized into slightly more than 100 units". In 2017, the Southern Poverty Law Center (SPLC), which monitors extremist groups, estimated that there were "at least 29 separate, rival Klan groups currently active in the United States, and they compete with one another for members, dues, news media attention and the title of being the true heir to the Ku Klux Klan". The formation of independent chapters has made KKK groups more difficult to infiltrate, and researchers find it hard to estimate their numbers. Analysts believe that about two-thirds of KKK members are concentrated in the Southern United States, with another third situated primarily in the lower Midwest.

For some time, the Klan's numbers have been steadily dropping. This decline has been attributed to the Klan's lack of competence in the use of the Internet, their history of violence, a proliferation of competing hate groups, and a decline in the number of young racist activists who are willing to join groups at all.

A 2016 analysis by the SPLC found that hate groups in general were on the rise in the United States. The ADL published a report in 2016 that concluded: "Despite a persistent ability to attract media attention, organized Ku Klux Klan groups are actually continuing a long-term trend of decline. They remain a collection of mostly small, disjointed groups that continually change in name and leadership."

In 2015, however, the number of KKK chapters nationwide grew from 72 to 190. The SPLC released a similar report stating that "there were significant increases in Klan as well as Black separatist groups".

Recent KKK membership campaigns have stimulated people's anxieties about illegal immigration, urban crime, civil unions, and same-sex marriage. In 2006, J. Keith Akins argued that "Klan literature and propaganda is rabidly homophobic and encourages violence against gays and lesbians. ...Since the late 1970s, the Klan has increasingly focused its ire on this previously ignored population." The Klan has produced Islamophobic propaganda and distributed anti-Islamic flyers.

Many KKK groups have formed strong alliances with other white supremacist groups, such as neo-Nazis. Some KKK groups have become increasingly "nazified", adopting the look and emblems of white power skinheads.

The American Civil Liberties Union (ACLU) has provided legal support to various factions of the KKK in defense of their First Amendment rights to hold public rallies, parades, and marches, as well as their right to field political candidates.

The imperial wizard of the Traditionalist American Knights, Frank Ancona, was fatally shot in Missouri in February 2017, several days after disappearing. The coroner declared his death a homicide. Ancona's wife and stepson were charged with first-degree murder in connection with the killing. The prosecutor in the case believes that the killing "happened because of a marital dispute" and was not connected to Ancona's Klan participation. Ancona's group "was not considered the largest or the most influential iteration of the Klan, but he was skilled at attracting the spotlight".

The February 14, 2019, edition of the Linden, Alabama, weekly newspaper The Democrat-Reporter carried an editorial titled "Klan needs to ride again" written by Goodloe Sutton—the newspaper's owner, publisher and editor—which urged the Klan to return to staging their night rides, because proposals were being made to raise taxes in the state. In an interview, Sutton suggested that Washington, D.C., could be "clean[ed] out" by way of lynchings. "We'll get the hemp ropes out, loop them over a tall limb and hang all of them," Sutton said. He also specified that he was only referring to hanging "socialist-communists", and compared the Klan to the NAACP. The editorial and Sutton's subsequent comments provoked calls for his resignation from Alabama politicians and the Alabama Press Association, which later censured Sutton and suspended the newspaper's membership. In addition the University of Southern Mississippi's School of Communication removed Sutton—who is an alumnus of that school from its Mass Communication and Journalism Hall of Fame, and "strongly condemned" his remarks. Sutton was also stripped of a distinguished community journalism award he had been presented in 2009 by Auburn University's Journalism Advisory Council. Sutton expressed no regret and said that the editorial was intended to be "ironic", but that "Not many people understand irony today."

Current Klan organizations
A list is maintained by the Anti-Defamation League (ADL):
 Bayou Knights of the Ku Klux Klan, prevalent in Texas, Oklahoma, Arkansas, Louisiana, and other areas of the Southern U.S.
 Church of the American Knights of the Ku Klux Klan.
 Imperial Klans of America.
 Knights of the White Camelia.
 Knights of the Ku Klux Klan, headed by national director and self-claimed pastor Thomas Robb, and based in Harrison and Zinc, Arkansas. It claims to be the largest Klan organization in America today.
 Loyal White Knights of the Ku Klux Klan, a North Carolina-based group headed by Will Quigg, is currently thought to be the largest KKK chapter.
 White Knights of the Ku Klux Klan.

Outside the United States
Aside from the Ku Klux Klan in Canada, there have been various attempts to organize KKK chapters outside the United States in places in Asia, Europe and Oceania, although most of them ultimately came to naught.

Africa 

In South Africa, during Apartheid, there were attempts, in the 1960s, to establish a branch at Rhodes University, with the help of Terry Venables. Some far-right activists took some of the lore such as by writing "Ku Klux Klan Africa" on the ANC Cape Town offices or wearing their dresses.

In the 1970s, Rhodesia had a Ku Klux Klan, led by Len Idensohn, attacking Ian Smith for his relative moderation.

America 
In Mexico, the KKK endorsed and funded the Calles government during the 1920s Cristero War with the intention of destroying Catholicism there. On 1924 vigilantes claimed to have organized themselves into a Klan against "criminals", publishing a program of "social epuration".

In São Paulo, Brazil, the website of a group called Imperial Klans of Brazil was shut down in 2003, and the group's leader was arrested.

The Klan has also been established in the Canal Zone.

Klan was present in Cuba, under the name of Ku Klux Klan Kubano, directed against both West Indian migrant workers and Afro-Cuban and using the fear of the 1912 Negro Rebellion.

Asia 

During the Vietnam War, klaverns were established on some US military bases, often tolerated by military authorities.
In the 1920s, the Klan briefly existed in Shanghai.

Europe 

Recruitment activity has also been reported in the United Kingdom. In the 1960s, "klaverns" were established in the Midlands, the following decade saw visits by leading Klansmen, and the 1990s saw recruitment drives in London, Scotland and the Midlands and huge internal turnoil and splintering: for example a leader, Allan Beshella, had to resign after 1972 conviction for child sex abuse was revealed. On 2018, Klan-clad far-right activists marched in front of a Northern Irish mosque.

In Germany, a KKK-related group, Ritter des Feurigen Kreuzes ("Knights of the Fiery Cross"), was established in 1925 by returning naturalized German-born US citizens in Berlin who managed to gather around 300 persons of middle-class occupations such as merchants and clerks. It soon saw the original founders being removed by internal conflicts, and mocking newspapers about the affair. After the Nazis took over Germany, the group disbanded and its members joined the Nazis. On 1991, Dennis Mahon, then of Oklahoma's White Knights of the Ku Klux Klan, reportedly helped to organize Klan groups. Another German KKK-related group, the European White Knights of the Ku Klux Klan, has organized and it gained notoriety in 2012 when the German media reported that two police officers who held membership in the organization would be allowed to keep their jobs. In 2019, the German authorities conducted raids against a possibly dangerous group called National Socialist Knights of the Ku Klux Klan Deutschland.

In the 1920s, the Klan was rumoured to exist in Lithuania and Czechoslovakia.

Oceania 

In Australia in the late 1990s, former One Nation member Peter Coleman established branches throughout the country, and circa 2012 the KKK has attempted to infiltrate other political parties such as Australia First. Branches of the Klan have previously existed in New South Wales and Victoria, as well as allegedly in Queensland. Unlike in the United States, the Australian branches did not require members to be Christian, but did require them to be white.

A Ku Klux Klan group was established in Fiji in 1874 by white American and British settlers wanting to enact White supremacy, although its operations were quickly put to an end by the British who, although not officially yet established as the major authority of Fiji, had played a leading role in establishing a new constitutional monarchy, the Kingdom of Fiji, that was being threatened by the activities of the Fijian Klan, which owned fortresses and artillery. By March, it had become the "British Subjects' Mutual Protection Society", which included Francis Herbert Dufty.

In the 1920s, the Klan had been rumoured to exist in New Zealand.

Titles and vocabulary

Membership in the Klan is secret. Like many fraternal organizations, the Klan has signs that members can use to recognize one another. In conversation, a member may use the acronym AYAK (Are you a Klansman?) to surreptitiously identify themselves to another potential member. The response AKIA (A Klansman I am) completes the greeting.

Throughout its varied history, the Klan has coined many words beginning with "Kl", including:
 Klabee – treasurers
 Klavern – local organization
 Imperial Kleagle – recruiter
 Klecktoken – initiation fee
 Kligrapp – secretary
 Klonvokation – gathering
 Kloran – ritual book
 Kloreroe – delegate
 Imperial Kludd – chaplain

All of the above terminology was created by William Joseph Simmons, as part of his 1915 revival of the Klan. The Reconstruction-era Klan used different titles; the only titles to carry over were "Wizard" for the overall leader of the Klan and "Night Hawk" for the official in charge of security.

The imperial kludd was the chaplain of the Imperial Klonvokation and he performed "such other duties as may be required by the imperial wizard".

The imperial kaliff was the second-highest position, after the imperial wizard.

Symbols
The Ku Klux Klan has utilized a variety of symbols over its history.

Blood Drop Cross
The Primary symbol used by the clan for the past century has been the Mystic Insignia of a Klansman, commonly known as the Blood Drop Cross, a white cross on a red disk with what appears to be a blood drop in the middle. It was first used in the early 1900s, with the symbol in the center originally appearing as a red and white Ying Yang which in the subsequent years, lost the white part and was reinterpreted as a "blood drop".

Triangular Klan symbol
The Triangular Ku Klux Klan symbol is made of what looks like a triangle inside a triangle, similar to a Sierpiński triangle, but in fact represents three letter Ks interlocked and facing inward, referencing the name of the group. A variation on this symbol has the K's facing outwards instead of inwards. It is an old Klan symbol that has also been resurrected in the modern day hate symbol.

Burning cross

Although predating the Klan, in modern times the symbol of the burning cross has become almost solely associated with the Ku Klux Klan and has become one of the most potent hate symbols in the United States. Burning crosses did not become associated with the clan until Thomas Dixon's The Clansman, and its film adaptation, D.W. Griffith's The Birth of a Nation inspired members of the second Klan to take up the practice. In the modern day the symbol of the burning cross is so associated with racial intimidation that it is used by many non-Klan racist elements and has spread to locations outside the United States.

See also

 Anti-mask laws
 Black Legion (political movement)
 Camp Nordland
 History of the Ku Klux Klan in New Jersey
 Ku Klux Klan in Maine
 Ku Klux Klan members in United States politics
 Ku Klux Klan raid (Inglewood)
 Ku Klux Klan titles and vocabulary
 Leaders of the Ku Klux Klan
 List of Confederate monuments and memorials
 List of Ku Klux Klan organizations
 List of organizations designated by the Southern Poverty Law Center as hate groups
 List of white nationalist organizations
 Mass racial violence in the United States
 Ocoee massacre
 Racism in the United States
 Removal of Confederate monuments and memorials
 Rosewood massacre
 Terrorism in the United States
 White supremacy in the United States

References

Notes

Citations

Bibliography

 
 
 
 
 
 
 
 
 
 
 
 
 
 
 
 
 
 
 
  Reviewed by 
 
 
 
 
 
 
 
 
 
 
 
 
 
 
 
 
 
 
 
 
 
 
 
 
 
 
  Winner of the 1918 Pulitzer Prize for history.

Further reading
 Eagles, Charles W., "Urban-Rural Conflict in the 1920s: A Historiographical Assessment". Historian (1986) 49#1 pp. 26–48.
 Horowitz, David A., "The Normality of Extremism: The Ku Klux Klan Revisited". Society (1998) 35#6 pp. 71–77.
 Johnsen, Julia E. ed. Ku Klux Klan (H.H. Wilson Reference Shelf) (1926) online, organized like a debate handbook with pro and con arguments from primary sources.
 Lay, Shawn, ed., The invisible empire in the west: Toward a new historical appraisal of the Ku Klux Klan of the 1920s (2nd ed. University of Illinois Press, 2004)
 Lewis, Michael, and Serbu, Jacqueline, "Kommemorating the Ku Klux Klan". Sociological Quarterly (1999) 40#1: 139–158. Deals with the memory of the KKK in Pulaski, Tennessee. Online

External links

Official websites
Because there are multiple Ku Klux Klan organizations, there are multiple official websites. Following are third-party lists of such organizations:
 From the Southern Poverty Law Center: Ku Klux Klan
 From the Anti-Defamation League:
 Tattered Robes: The State of the Ku Klux Klan in the United States (2016) – not organized as a list of names but many names appear in this report
 Ku Klux Klan – Active Groups (By State) (2011) – archived list

Other links
 Prescript of the * * first edition of the Klans 1867 prescript
 Revised and Amended Prescript of the Order of the * * * first edition of the Klans 1868 prescript
 Civil Rights Greensboro 
 The Ku Klux Klan in Washington State, from the Seattle Civil Rights and Labor History Project, examines the influence of the second KKK in the State during the 1920s.
 Buffalo Ku Klux Klan Membership List, digitized by the Buffalo History Museum
 "Ku Klux Klan", Southern Poverty Law Center
 "KKK", Anti-Defamation League
 Video clip of 2014 interview with hooded KKK member by biracial director and filmmaker Mo Asumang for her documentary The Aryan
 "Inside Today's KKK", multimedia, Life magazine, April 13, 2009
 Interview with Stanley F. Horn, author of Invisible Empire: The Story of the Ku Klux Klan, 1866–1871 (1939), Forest History Society, Inc., May 1978
 Booknotes interview with Jack Nelson on Terror in the Night: The Klan's Campaign Against the Jews, February 7, 1993
 Icons of Hate at A History of Central Florida Podcast, examines the Ku Klux Klan's role in Central Florida in the second quarter of the 20th century
 FBI file on the Ku Klux Klan
 1871 Congressional Testimony on the Ku Klux Klan
 Mapping the Second Ku Klux Klan, 1915–1940, VCU Libraries
 Ku Klux Klan collection, circa 1875–1990, at the Stuart A. Rose Manuscript, Archives, and Rare Book Library.
 Quaint Customs and Methods of the Ku Klux Klan from The Literary Digest, August, 1922
 Knights of the Ku Klux Klan, Klan No. 51 records, Mt. Rainier, Maryland at the University of Maryland Libraries

 
1865 establishments in Tennessee
1915 establishments in the United States
Anti-black racism in Canada
Anti-Catholic organizations
Anti-Catholicism in the United States
Anti-communism in the United States
Anti-Irish sentiment
Anti-Italian sentiment
Christian anti-Judaism
Antisemitism in Canada
Antisemitism in Europe
Christianity-related controversies
COINTELPRO targets
Democratic Party (United States)
Reactionary
Hate crime
History of the Southern United States
20th century in the United States
Islamophobia in the United States
Lynching in the United States
Neo-Confederate organizations
Neo-Nazi organizations in the United States
Organizations based in North America designated as terrorist
Organizations established in 1865
Political masks
Political violence in the United States
Presidency of Ulysses S. Grant
Race-related controversies in the United States
Reconstruction Era
Religiously motivated violence in the United States
Right-wing populism in the United States
Stone Mountain
Social movement organizations
Progressive Era in the United States